Eivind Melleby (born 19 April 1972) is a Norwegian sailor.

Career 

In 2008–09, he was a crewmember on the boat Ericsson 3 in the Volvo Ocean Race.

Melleby competed at the 2012 Summer Olympics in London.

Melleby and his crew Joshua Revkin (USA) won the 2017 Star World Championship.

References

External links
 

Norwegian male sailors (sport)
1972 births
Living people
Sportspeople from Oslo
Sailors at the 2012 Summer Olympics – Star
Olympic sailors of Norway
Volvo Ocean Race sailors